Premio Lo Nuestro 2011 was held on Thursday February 17, 2011 at The American Airlines Arena and was broadcast live on the Univision Network. The nominees were announced on December 2, 2010 during a live televised show "Gala de Nominados", hosted by Lourdes Stephen from Sal y Pimienta and Poncho de Anda from ¡Despierta América! on Univision Network.

Hosts
 Angélica Vale
 Jaime Camil

Performers

Presenters

Ninel Conde
Roselyn Sánchez
Javier Poza
Bárbara Bermudo
Jose Luis Terrazas Sr
Jose Luis Terrazas Jr
Guy Ecker
Vanessa Villela
Goyo
Carlos Baute
Ednita Nazario
Gerardo Ortíz
Adamari López
Belinda
J-King & Maximan
Olga Tañón

Juan Luis Guerra
Andrea Legarreta
Zion & Lennox
Diana Reyes
Luis Enrique
Héctor "El Torito" Acosta 
Debi Nova
Rodrigo Lombardi
Lili Estefan
Ilia Calderón
Valentino Lanús
Don Francisco
Blanca Soto
Julian Gil
Carolina la O
Larry Hernandez

Special awards
Lifetime Achievement Award (Premio Lo Nuestro a la Excelencia)
Maná
Special Career Achievement Award (Trayectoria Artista del año)
 Lucero
World Icon Award (Premio Ícono Mundial)
 Ricky Martin

Nominees and winners

Pop

Rock

Tropical

Regional Mexican

Urban

Video

References

External links
 official Site Premio Lo Nuestro
 Official list of winners
 En El Brasero release of Premio Lo Nuestro 2011 Nominees announcement

Lo Nuestro Awards by year
2011 music awards
2011 in Latin music
2010s in Miami